In basketball, points are accumulated through free throws or field goals. The National Basketball League's (NBL) scoring title was awarded to the player with the most total points in a given season.

Naismith Memorial Basketball Hall of Fame inductee Bobby McDermott holds the NBL all-time record for career points scored (3,583), while fellow Hall of Famer George Mikan holds the single season points (1,195) and points per game (21.3) records. McDermott earned the most points spanning an eight-year NBL career, but Mikan only played two seasons and set both records during 1948–49, the final year the league existed.

Key

Season scoring leaders

Career scoring leaders

See also
 List of National Basketball Association annual scoring leaders
 List of National Basketball Association career scoring leaders

References
General

Specific

Scoring